The Nothing They Need is the seventh studio album by American psychedelic rock band Dead Meadow. It was released on March 2, 2018 under Xemu Records.

The CD release of the album includes, as a hidden bonus track, Dead Meadow's cover of The Beatles song "Tomorrow Never Knows," which was released digitally in 2022.

Critical reception
The Nothing They Need was met with generally favorable reviews from critics. At Metacritic, which assigns a weighted average rating out of 100 to reviews from mainstream publications, this release received an average score of 74, based on 6 reviews.

Track listing

References

2018 albums
Dead Meadow albums
Xemu Records albums